Ta Kream  is a khum (commune) of Banan District in Battambang Province in north-western Cambodia.

Villages
Ta Kream contains 11 villages.

Kamping Pouy Reservoir

Within the area of Ta Kream commune lies the 6-kilometer-long and 1.9-kilometer-wide Kamping Puoy Reservoir. This reservoir can hold about 110 million cubic meters of water, which is mainly used for irrigation.

It is located around 30 km west of the city of Battambang and accessible by a new road. It is popular with the inhabitants of Battambang and elsewhere who come out here in the weekend for a picnic. The journey to the reservoir is part of the attraction as it passes through some stunning countryside. Once at the reservoir there are a number of food and drink stalls to rest at and it is possible to charter a boat to take you out on the lake and maybe visit some of the people who live in stilt houses.
 
The reservoir was originally built by the Khmer Rouge in one of their grander schemes. Thousands of people died during the construction of the dam.

References

Communes of Battambang province
Banan District, Battambang Province